Arima, also called Krine, was a town of ancient Cilicia, on the coast east of Seleucia ad Calycadnum. Arima was noted in Greek Mythology in connection with Typhon and Arima, couch of Typhoeus.

Its site is tentatively located near Narlıkuyu in Asiatic Turkey.

References

Populated places in ancient Cilicia
Former populated places in Turkey
Roman towns and cities in Turkey
Populated places of the Byzantine Empire
History of Mersin Province
Locations in Greek mythology